The 2020–21 Liechtenstein Cup was the 76th season of Liechtenstein's annual cup competition. Seven clubs compete with a total of 15 teams for one spot in the second qualifying round of the 2021–22 UEFA Europa Conference League. FC Vaduz are the defending champions.The cup was abandoned due to COVID-19 pandemic in Liechtenstein.

Participating clubs

Teams in bold are still active in the competition.

TH Title holders.

First round
The first round involved all except the four highest-placed teams. Five teams received a bye to the second round by drawing of lot. FC Vaduz II did not enter the competition.

|colspan="3" style="background-color:#99CCCC"|

|-
|colspan="3" style="background-color:#99CCCC"|

|}

Source:

Second round
The second round involved all except the four highest-placed teams and the three teams eliminated in the first round.

|colspan="3" style="background-color:#99CCCC"|

|-
|colspan="3" style="background-color:#99CCCC"|

|-
|colspan="3" style="background-color:#99CCCC"|

|-
|colspan="3" style="background-color:#99CCCC"|

|}

Source:

Quarter-finals
The quarter-finals involved the four teams who won in the second round, as well as the top four highest placed teams (FC Vaduz, FC Balzers, USV Eschen/Mauren  and FC Ruggell). The cup competition is canceled due scheduling reasons in May 2021.

|}

References

External links
 

Liechtenstein Football Cup seasons
Cup
Liechtenstein Cup
Liechtenstein